Philip Herman Bonham-Carter (12 November 1891 – 7 January 1934) was an English first-class cricketer and Royal Navy officer.

Life and naval career
The son of Herman Bonham-Carter and his wife, Margaret Louisa Wathen, he was born at Karachi in British India. Enlisting in the Royal Navy, Bonham-Carter was promoted to the rank of sub-lieutenant in January 1912, with promotion to the rank of lieutenant coming in June 1913. He served during the First World War, eventually reaching the rank of lieutenant commander. A physically strong and deeply religious man, he was known during his naval service as "Bonham the Good". Bonham-Carter played first-class cricket for the Royal Navy, debuting against the British Army cricket team at Lord's in 1919. He played two further first-class matches for the Royal Navy, against the Army at Lord's in 1921 and the Marylebone Cricket Club at Chatham in 1929. Across his three appearances, he scored a total of 35 runs with a high score of 16.

He died at Hampstead in January 1934. His uncle, Maurice Bonham-Carter, was a senior naval officer and first-class cricketer, while his grandfather, William Wathen, and great-grandfather, George Norman, both played first-class cricket.

References

External links

1891 births
1934 deaths
People from Karachi
Royal Navy officers
Royal Navy personnel of World War I
English cricketers
Royal Navy cricketers
Philip
British people in colonial India